Andrey Kislenko is a retired Ukrainian professional footballer who played as a defender.

Career
Andrey Kislenko started his career in 1999 with Yunist Chernihiv a club in the city of Chernihiv. In the same year he moved to Desna Chernihiv, the main club of the city, where he played 2 matches in Ukrainian Second League in the season 1999–2000 and get 9 place in the league. In 2001 he played 1 match with FC Ros Bila Tserkva 2 and 13 matches for Ros Bila Tserkva scoring 2 goals. In 2001 he moved to CSKA Kyiv where he stayed until 2003, where he played 25 matches. In 2002 he moved to Dnipro Cherkasy where he played 22 matches and scored 1 goal. In summer 2004 he moved to Stal Kamianske for two season where he played 32 matches and scored 1 goal. In 2006 he moved to Knyazha Shchaslyve  where he played 16 matches and in 2007 he played 7 matches with Feniks-Illichovets Kalinine. In 2009 he moved back to CSKA Kyiv where he played 6 matches.

References

External links 
 Andrey Kislenko at footballfacts.ru

1982 births
Living people
Footballers from Chernihiv
FC Desna Chernihiv players
FC Yunist Chernihiv players
FC Ros Bila Tserkva players
FC Dnipro Cherkasy players
FC Stal Kamianske players
FC Knyazha Shchaslyve players
FC Feniks-Illichovets Kalinine players
Ukrainian footballers
Ukrainian Premier League players
Ukrainian First League players
Ukrainian Second League players
Association football defenders